Kentucky Route 2354 (KY 2354) is a state highway in the city of Owenton in Owen County, Kentucky. The highway runs  along Roland Avenue from KY 22 north to U.S. Route 127 (US 127) and KY 227. KY 2354 provides a western bypass of downtown Owenton for traffic between KY 22 and US 127.

Route description
KY 2354 begins at KY 22 (Seminary Street) west of the Central Owenton Historic District. The highway heads north along Roland Avenue to a tangent intersection with US 127 and KY 227, which run concurrently along Main Street, northwest of downtown. The Kentucky Transportation Cabinet classifies KY 2354 as a state secondary highway.

History
The Kentucky Transportation Cabinet reclassified KY 2354 as a state secondary highway through a March 7, 2011, official order; the highway had been classified as a supplemental road.

Major intersections

References

2354
2354
State highways in the United States shorter than one mile